Álvaro Fidalgo Fernández (born 9 April 1997) is a Spanish professional footballer who plays as an attacking midfielder for Liga MX club América.

Club career

Real Madrid
Born in Hevia, Siero, Asturias, Fidalgo joined Real Madrid's La Fábrica in 2012, from Sporting de Gijón. On 21 June 2016, after finishing his formation, he was loaned to Segunda División B side CF Rayo Majadahonda for the season.

Fidalgo made his senior debut on 20 August 2016, starting in a 0–0 draw against Sestao River Club. In July 2017, after being a regular starter, he returned to his parent club and was assigned to the reserves also in the third division.

Fidalgo made his first team debut for Real Madrid on 6 December 2018, coming on as a late substitute for Vinícius Júnior in a 6–1 home routing of UD Melilla, for the season's Copa del Rey. For the 2019–20 season, he was named team captain of Raúl's Castilla.

Castellón
On 25 August 2020, Fidalgo signed a three-year deal with Segunda División newcomers CD Castellón. He made his professional debut on 12 September, coming on as a second-half substitute for Jorge Fernández in a 2–1 away win against SD Ponferradina.

América
On 1 February 2021, despite featuring regularly, Fidalgo was loaned to Liga MX side Club América for the remainder of the campaign, with a buyout clause. On 2 June 2021, Fidalgo signed a four-year deal with Club América.

Personal life
Fidalgo's grandfather Rafael was also a footballer. A defender, he played professionally for UP Langreo, Real Oviedo and Caudal Deportivo.

Honours
Individual
Liga MX Best XI: Guardianes 2021
CONCACAF Champions League Team of the Tournament: 2021
Liga MX All-Star: 2022

References

External links
Real Madrid profile

1997 births
Living people
People from Siero
Spanish footballers
Footballers from Asturias
Association football midfielders
Segunda División players
Segunda División B players
Liga MX players
Real Madrid Castilla footballers
CF Rayo Majadahonda players
CD Castellón footballers
Club América footballers
Spain youth international footballers
Spanish expatriate footballers
Spanish expatriate sportspeople in Mexico
Expatriate footballers in Mexico